Keri Morrison (born July 3, 1991) is a Canadian speed skater.

Career

2018 Winter Olympics
In January 2018, Morrison was named to Canada's 2018 Olympic team.

References

1991 births
Living people
Canadian female speed skaters
Speed skaters at the 2018 Winter Olympics
Olympic speed skaters of Canada
Universiade bronze medalists for Canada
Universiade medalists in short track speed skating
Competitors at the 2015 Winter Universiade